Rachel Jingco Alejandro (born February 18, 1974) is a Filipino singer and actress.

Biography

Early life
Alejandro's mother and father separated when she was four. Her mother then remarried and moved to the United States. Together with her father Hajji and his new partner, Rio Diaz, Alejandro and her sister Barni spent time in Manila and the US.

Her theater experience began with The Sound of Music at eight years of age, then Peter Pan at 15, Noli Me Tangere at 18, then Alikabok at 21, followed by Sino Ka Ba Jose Rizal, Larawan, Fire Water Woman, and more recently

Career
Rachel Alejandro first entered the world of showbiz at the age of 12, when she was a host on the popular TV show That's Entertainment. At 15 from Pangasinan Province, following her successful TV stint, Alejandro recorded her first album, Just a Minute, for Alpha Records. The album spawned several hit songs including the No. 1 single "Mr. Kupido", as well as "K.S.P. (Kulang Sa Pansin)" and "Kay Tagal". The album went gold and Alejandro's recording career then took off. Her second album, Watch Me Now, featured a revival of "Nakapagtataka", the signature song of her father, pop icon Hajji Alejandro.

Her powerful rendition of the song earned her the Awit Award for Best Performance by a Female Recording Artist and the Guillermo Mendoza Memorial Foundation Award for Best Female Singer/Entertainer. May Minamahal, which contained the award-winning single "Babalik-balikan", became Alejandro's first platinum album in 1992. That same year, her career got another boost when she competed at the Golden Stag International Song Festival in Brasov, Romania, winning the award for Best Interpretation of a Romanian Song. Her 1994 album, Sentimental, featured the multi-awarded song "Paalam Na" which Alejandro co-wrote with then-boyfriend Dingdong Avanzado.

In 1996, Alejandro celebrated her 10 years in showbiz by releasing an anniversary album and appearing in her first major concert, with guests Janno Gibbs, Ogie Alcasid and the Street Boys. As Alejandro said in an interview with Maryo B Labad, "In the past years, siguro halos lahat nasubukan ko na as far as the entertainment scene is concerned. And my efforts have paid off." Her album Tanging Pangarap, her first for Viva Records, was released in 2001. The carrier single was written by her longtime former boyfriend Lee Robin Salazar. It also contains the 2000 Metropop Song Festival winner "Forever and a Day" composed by Angelo Villegas. Recently, Alejandro released a self-produced album under a distribution agreement with Sony Music Philippines entitled Believe with original songs and cover songs from some of her stage musical projects.

Alejandro has also enjoyed success as an actress, appearing in films and theater productions. In 2001, she took the role of Mimi Marquez in a production of Rent that played in Manila and Singapore. A review from the Singapore Straits Times praised Alejandro's performance writing, "Alejandro’s Mimi sounds even better than Broadway’s Daphne Rubin-Vega. Her crystal clear voice is far stronger than the smokey whisper of Rubin-Vega". She starred in a run of the musical comedy Xanadu in 2010. In 2012, she starred in Atlantis Productions' Avenue Q which played at the Marina Bay Sands in Singapore. This was her fourth time doing the show as she had previously performed in several repeats of the musical in Manila. She appeared in an Atlantis Production of Aida as Amneris in June 2011 and in July 2013, she accepted the role of Justice in a repeat run of Rock of Ages in Manila.

In 2017, she starred in the musical film Ang Larawan, which she also was the executive producer, marking her comeback in film for the first time in 21 years. Her last major movie before that was 1996's Mumbaki with Raymart Santiago and directed by Butch Perez for VIVA Films. She subsequently portrayed Aurora Quezon in the 2019 film Quezon's Game which garnered her several best actress awards.

On July 1, 2018, ASAP paid tribute to her and awarded her an ASAPinoy Plaque of recognition for her contributions to OPM. On that day she together with other performers such as Lyca Gairanod, Jona Soquite, and legendary singers Zsa Zsa Padilla, Martin Nievera, and her father Hajji Alejandro performed all her hit songs. Alejandro currently stars in the Philippine-Australian jukebox musical All Out of Love: The Musical, which is based on the songs of Air Supply.

On July 23, 2021, Alejandro became an artist for Star Magic and will star on her first teleserye called The Broken Marriage Vow.

Personal life 
On April 9, 2011, Alejandro married Carlos Santa Maria. She is currently residing in Makati.

Discography

Filmography

Films

Television
That's Entertainment (GMA Network)
Saturday Entertainment (GMA Network)
Shades (GMA Network) – (hosted by Randy Santiago)
Lunch Date (GMA Network)
Eat Bulaga! (RPN; ABS-CBN; GMA Network)
GMA Supershow (GMA Network)
Ryan Ryan Musikahan (ABS-CBN)
The Sharon Cuneta Show (ABS-CBN)
Sa Linggo nAPO Sila (ABS-CBN)
ASAP Natin 'To (ABS-CBN)
R.S.V.P. (GMA Network) 
Salo Salo Together (GMA Network) 
Katok Mga Misis (GMA Network) 
Music Bureau (TV5) 
'Sang Linggo nAPO Sila (ABS-CBN)
Maalaala Mo Kaya (ABS-CBN)
Pinoy Dream Academy (ABS-CBN)
Magpakailanman (GMA Network)
The Ryzza Mae Show (GMA Network) 
Mars (GMA News TV 27)
Real Talk (CNN Philippines)
It's Showtime (Philippine TV program) (ABS-CBN)
Family Feud (Philippine game show): That's Girls vs ASAP Sessionistas (ABS-CBN 2)
Tonight With Boy Abunda (ABS-CBN 2)
Magandang Buhay (ABS-CBN 2)
Minute To Win It: Last Tandem Standing (ABS-CBN 2)
I Can See Your Voice (ABS-CBN)
Mars Pa More (GMA Network)
The Broken Marriage Vow (Kapamilya Channel)

Books
Sexy Chef Cookbook (December 4, 2013)
Eat, Clean, Love (2015)
21 Days to a Sexier You (2017)
Ang Larawan: From Stage to Screen (2017)
FHM (March 2018)
Liwayway Magasin (February 19, 2018)
Bannawag Magasin (May 7, 2018)
Liwayway Magasin (June 10, 2019)

Awards

References

External links
Official Website

1974 births
Living people
21st-century Filipino singers
21st-century Filipino women singers
Filipino women pop singers
21st-century Filipino actresses
That's Entertainment (Philippine TV series)
That's Entertainment Wednesday Group Members
GMA Network personalities
ABS-CBN personalities